The Bergin Block was an historic commercial building in Lewiston, Maine.

The block was built in 1912 and added to the National Register of Historic Places in 1986.  It was demolished in 1999.

See also
National Register of Historic Places listings in Androscoggin County, Maine

References

Commercial buildings on the National Register of Historic Places in Maine
Buildings and structures in Lewiston, Maine
Demolished buildings and structures in Maine
National Register of Historic Places in Lewiston, Maine
Buildings and structures demolished in 1999
Former National Register of Historic Places in Maine